Col. Charles S. Hamilton (May 27, 1882 – June 27, 1968), of Washington, D.C., was noted philatelist who served in the United States Army during the Mexican Revolution.

Military career
Hamilton served in the United States Army. He was stationed in the United States Army Quartermaster Corps along the Mexican border from 1913 to 1914. He also served with General John J. Pershing during Pershing's expedition into Mexico during 1915 and 1916.

Collecting interests
Hamilton became interested in Mexican postage stamps and postal history while serving in Mexico. While in Mexico, he obtained first hand information on Mexican postage stamp issues, and became an expert on stamps of Sonora and those that were issued by various postal authorities during the Mexican Revolution. The colonel's Mexican collections were considered world class, and he exhibited portions of the collections at shows and exhibitions.

Philatelic literature
Hamilton wrote extensively of his studies of Mexican stamps, particularly those of the Mexican Civil War era.

Honors and awards
Colonel Hamilton was named to the Mexico-Elmhurst Philatelic Society International Hall of Fame in 1965. In 1969 he was named to the American Philatelic Society Hall of Fame.

See also

Postage stamps and postal history of Mexico
Philatelic literature

External links
 APS Hall of Fame - Col. Charles S. Hamilton

1882 births
1968 deaths
Philatelic literature
American philatelists
People from Washington, D.C.
United States Army officers
American military personnel of the Mexican–American War
Philately of Mexico
American Philatelic Society
American expatriates in Mexico